Yoshitaka Naito   (born February 17, 1984) is a Japanese mixed martial artist from Inzai, Chiba Prefecture, Japan. He is a former two-time ONE Strawweight World Champion. Naito is furthermore a former Shooto World Flyweight (114 lb) Champion, where he holds the record for flyweight title defenses, and was voted Fighter of the Year for two consecutive years.

He is regarded as one of the best strawweights in the world, and is ranked as the #2 all time strawweight by Fight Matrix.

Early life 
In his childhood, Naito was a quiet kid who loved manga. One of his favorite titles was Doraemon, and during his martial arts career, he earned the nickname “Nobita” because of his resemblance to the lead character in the Doraemon manga.

Naito didn't practice any martial arts as a child, but was a member of the soccer club in junior high school.  He had few friends during his adolescence and struggled with his grades in school. He later dropped out of high school, a short-sighted decision he later said he regretted.

Naito fell in love with mixed martial arts in the early 2000s. He loved watching Kazushi Sakuraba, who he calls his martial arts hero. He was fascinated by the submissions Sakuraba was able to pull off against foreign athletes in Pride Fighting Championships and soon found himself training at Paraestra Matsudo. He was invited to train at Paraestra Matsudo by his brother Nobutaka. His brother is also a mixed martial artist, currently competing with Shooto.

Martial Arts Career

Shooto
Naito began training mixed martial arts at the age of 22. Despite a rough start to his training and amateur competitions, he won the 2011 All Japan Amateur Shooto Tournament.

Naito made his professional debut with the Shooto organization on August 25, 2012, at the age of 27. He defeated Tsubasa Fujikawa via guillotine choke in round two in the semifinals of the Rookie Flyweight Tournament. In the finals he beat Shota Kondo by KO to become the Rookie Flyweight tournament champion. He won his next five fights to earn a title shot against reigning Shooto Flyweight Champion Shinya Murofushi.

In the main event of Shooto 7th Round 2014 on September 27, 2014, Naito submitted Murofushi with three seconds remaining in the fight to win the Shooto Flyweight Title.

Naito made his first title defense against Ryuto Sawada on July 26, 2015. He won by arm-triangle choke in the fourth round.

He made his second title defense against Junji Ito on November 29, 2015. He won by decision.

One Championship
In 2016, Naito signed with ONE Championship.

Naito moved down to the strawweight division and made his ONE Championship debut against the reigning and undefeated ONE Strawweight World Champion Dejdamrong Sor Amnuaysirichoke in his native Bangkok, Thailand on May 27, 2016. He defeated Dejdamrong by rear-naked choke in round four to become the ONE Strawweight World Champion.

As the new champ, he made his first ONE Strawweight World Title defense against Joshua Pacio on October 7, 2016. He submitted Pacio by rear-naked choke in the third round to retain the belt.

Naito made his next title defense against Brazilian Jiu-Jitsu World Champion Alex Silva on December 9, 2017. After five rounds, Silva defeated Naito by unanimous decision to hand him his first professional loss and take the belt.

A rematch between Naito and Silva was set for May 12, 2018. This time, Naito defeated Silva by split decision to reclaim the title.

Naito made the first defense of his second ONE Strawweight World Title reign against Joshua Pacio in a rematch from nearly two years earlier on September 22, 2018. He lost the title by unanimous decision.

On March 8, 2019, Naito faced Wushu World Champion Rene Catalan. He lost via TKO in the first round.

Naito faced Silva for a third time on May 17, 2019. He won by unanimous decision to complete their trilogy.

He faced Pongsiri Mitsatit on November 8, 2019, and defeated him by unanimous decision.

Naito next faced Yosuke Saruta at Road to One 3: Tokyo Fight Night on September 10, 2020. He lost the fight via unanimous decision.

Championships and Accomplishments 

Shooto
2011 All Japan Amateur Shooto Tournament Champion
2012 Shooto Rookie Flyweight Tournament Championship
Shooto World Flyweight (114 lb) Championship (One time)
Two successful title defenses
Most consecutive Shooto World Flyweight (114 lb) Championship defenses (2)
2014 and 2015 Shooto Fighter of the Year
2015 Fight of the Year 
Undefeated in Shooto (10-0) 
ONE Championship
ONE Strawweight World Championship (Two times)
One successful title defense
Fight Matrix
Strawweight Lineal Champion (One time, former)
eFight.jp
September 2014, May 2016 and May 2018 Fighter of the Month

Mixed martial arts record
 

|-
| Loss
| align=center|15–4
| Yosuke Saruta
| Decision (unanimous)
| Road to One 3: Tokyo Fight Night
| 
| align=center|3
| align=center|5:00
| Tokyo, Japan
|
|-
|Win
|align=center|15–3
|Pongsiri Mitsatit
|Decision (unanimous)
|ONE Championship: Masters Of Fate
|
|align=center|3
|align=center|5:00
|Manila, Philippines
|
|-
|Win
|align=center|14–3
|Alex Silva
|Decision (unanimous)
|ONE Championship: Enter the Dragon
|
|align=center|3
|align=center|5:00
|Kallang, Singapore
|
|-
|Loss
|align=center|13–3
|Rene Catalan
|TKO (punches)
|ONE Championship: Reign of Valor
|
|align=center|1
|align=center|4:32
|Yangon, Myanmar
|
|-
|Loss
|align=center|13–2
|Joshua Pacio
|Decision (unanimous)
|ONE Championship: Conquest of Heroes
|
|align=center|5
|align=center|5:00
|Jakarta, Indonesia
|
|-
|Win
|align=center|13–1
|Alex Silva
|Decision (split)
|ONE Championship: Grit and Glory
|
|align=center|5
|align=center|5:00
|Jakarta, Indonesia
|
|-
|Loss
|align=center|12–1
|Alex Silva
|Decision (unanimous)
|ONE Championship: Warriors of the World
|
|align=center|5
|align=center|5:00
|Bangkok, Thailand
|
|-
|Win
|align=center|12–0
|Joshua Pacio
|Submission (Rear-Naked Choke)
|ONE Championship: State of Warriors
|
|align=center|3
|align=center|1:33
|Yangon, Myanmar
|
|-
|Win
|align=center|11–0
|Dejdamrong Sor Amnuaysirichoke
|Submission (Rear-Naked Choke)
|ONE Championship: Kingdom of Champions
|
|align=center|4
|align=center|4:00
|Bangkok, Thailand
|
|-
|Win
|align=center|10–0
|Junji Ito
|Decision (Unanimous)
|Shooto - Professional Shooto 11/29
|
|align=center|5
|align=center|5:00
|Tokyo, Japan
|
|-
|Win
|align=center|9–0
|Ryuto Sawada
|Submission (Arm-Triangle Choke)
|Shooto - Professional Shooto 7/26
|
|align=center|4
|align=center|4:46
|Tokyo, Japan
|
|-
|Win
|align=center|8–0
|Shinya Murofushi
|Submission (Rear-Naked Choke)
|Shooto - 7th Round 2014
|
|align=center|5
|align=center|4:57
|Tokyo, Japan
|
|-
|Win
|align=center|7–0
|Yuki Shojo
|Decision (Unanimous)
|Shooto - 2nd Round 2014
|
|align=center|3
|align=center|5:00
|Tokyo, Japan
|
|-
|Win
|align=center|6–0
|Tadaaki Yamamoto
|Decision (Unanimous)
|Shooto - 5th Round 2013
|
|align=center|3
|align=center|5:00
|Tokyo, Japan
|
|-
|Win
|align=center|5–0
|Takeshi Sato
|Decision (Unanimous)
|Shooto - Shooting Disco 22
|
|align=center|3
|align=center|5:00
|Tokyo, Japan
|
|-
|Win
|align=center|4–0
|Atsushi Takeuchi
|Decision (Majority)
|Shooto - Shooting Disco 21: Catch the Moment
|
|align=center|3
|align=center|5:00
|Tokyo, Japan
|
|-
|Win
|align=center|3–0
|Takafumi Ato
|Submission (Armbar)
|Shooto - Shooting Disco 20
|
|align=center|3
|align=center|3:10
|Tokyo, Japan
|
|-
|Win
|align=center|2–0
|Shota Kondo
|KO (Punches)
|Shooto - The Rookie Tournament Final 2012
|
|align=center|2
|align=center|3:16
|Tokyo, Japan
|
|-
|Win
|align=center|1–0
|Tsubasa Fujikawa
|Submission (Guillotine Choke)
|Shooto - Gig Tokyo 11
|
|align=center|2
|align=center|1:34
|Tokyo, Japan
|
|-
|}

Amateur mixed martial arts record

|-
|Win
|align=center| 6–1
|Tetsuya Yoshitake
|Decision (Unanimous)
|2012 Shooto Rookie Flyweight Tournament 
|18 September 2011
|align=center|2
|align=center|3:00
|Odawara, Japan
|
|-
|Win
|align=center| 5–1
|Atsushi Makita
|Decision (Unanimous)
|2012 Shooto Rookie Flyweight Tournament 
|18 September 2011
|align=center|2
|align=center|2:00
|Odawara, Japan
|
|-
|Win
|align=center| 4–1
|Yusuke Kamata
|Decision (Unanimous)
|2012 Shooto Rookie Flyweight Tournament 
|18 September 2011
|align=center|2
|align=center|2:00
|Odawara, Japan
|
|-
|Win
|align=center| 3–1
|Hiroaki Shishino
|Decision (Unanimous)
|2012 Shooto Rookie Flyweight Tournament 
|18 September 2011
|align=center|1
|align=center|4:00
|Odawara, Japan
|
|-
|Loss
|align=center| 2–1
|Komazawa Takayuki
|Decision (Unanimous)
|2010 East Japan Amateur Shooto Tournament
|23 December 2010
|align=center|1
|align=center|4:00
|Tokorozawa, Saitama, Japan
|
|-
|Win
|align=center| 2–0
|Takuya Okada
|DQ (Foul)
|DuroFF
|9 March 2008
|align=center|2
|align=center|0:13
|Yokkaichi, Japan
|
|-
|Win
|align=center| 1–0
|Hidemi Nahata
|Decision (Unanimous)
|Omiya FF 57 
|21 October 2007
|align=center|2
|align=center|2:00
|Ōmiya, Saitama, Japan
|}

See also
 List of male mixed martial artists

References 

1984 births
Living people
Japanese male mixed martial artists
Sportspeople from Chiba Prefecture
People from Inzai
Flyweight mixed martial artists
ONE Championship champions